The Men's BMX 20" wheel event at the 2010 South American Games was held on March 18.  The qualifications started at 9:20, the semifinals at 10:20 and the Final at 11:05.

Medalists

Results

Qualification

Heat 1

Heat 2

Heat 3

Heat 4

Semifinals

Heat 1

Heat 2

Final

References
Qualification
Semifinals
Final

Cycling at the 2010 South American Games
2010 in BMX